Frank McCoubrey (born 5 February 1967) is a Unionist politician and loyalist in Northern Ireland, as well as a community activist and researcher. He is a leading member of the Ulster Political Research Group (UPRG) and a member of Belfast City Council, representing the Court area as a Democratic Unionist Party (DUP) councillor. McCoubrey is a native of Highfield, Belfast.

Emergence in UPRG
In 1996 he was an unsuccessful candidate in the Northern Ireland Forum election in West Belfast. McCoubrey was first elected to Belfast City Council in 1997 as a member of the Ulster Democratic Party and was eventually elected as deputy mayor in 2000, with the votes of the Democratic Unionist Party and Ulster Unionist Party councillors. Following the collapse of the UDP and the resulting decision of the Ulster Defence Association (UDA) to reconvene the UPRG McCoubrey was chosen along with Sammy Duddy, Frankie Gallagher and Tommy Kirkham to lead the new group. McCoubrey became one of the leading figures in the UPRG and even joined Kirkham and Gallagher in meeting Irish Taoiseach Bertie Ahern in 2004, along with UDA leader Jackie McDonald and prisoners' spokesman Stanley Fletcher in a 'historic' event.

In his role as a councillor McCoubrey opened early channels between loyalism and Sinn Féin, joining UDP colleague John White in holding an unofficial meeting with Alex Maskey in Belfast City Hall in June 2001. McCoubrey also led a campaign in 2003 to bring Gerry Adams to trial for violation of the human rights of the people of the Shankill. McCoubrey, who organised a petition to this effect, argued that Adams' and Sinn Féin's policy of abstentionism meant that the people of the Shankill were being denied representation and sought to bring a case to the European courts to alter the situation. Ultimately, however, nothing came of the initiative.

Loyalist Day of Culture controversy
McCoubrey's term of office as deputy mayor was soon marked by controversy after he wore his official robes and chain of office to a "Loyalist Day of Culture" held on the Lower Shankill on 19 August 2000, where he shared a stage with UDA members Johnny Adair and Michael Stone at the height of a loyalist feud between that group and the Ulster Volunteer Force. Adair had used the Day to bring the feud to its conclusion by running the Ulster Volunteer Force out of the Shankill by attacking their stronghold, the Rex Bar. Calls were made for McCoubrey to resign, although he claimed that he did not know Adair and Stone would be there and that he was not expecting the gun-fire in the paramilitary show of strength that ended the night. Ultimately the Council decided not to take any action against McCoubrey, with a motion of censure brought in by the Alliance Party of Northern Ireland's David Alderdice defeated in the council. McCoubrey also faced criticism from a former Lord Mayor of Belfast, Hugh Smyth, who had been a friend of his until the incident, with a number of Smyth's colleagues in the Progressive Unionist Party amongst those ran out of the Shankill by Adair and 'C' Company.

Subsequent activity
McCoubrey remains a member of the Council. He officially sat as an Independent, as do all elected members of the UPRG. However, in November 2012 it was announced that McCoubrey was giving up his independent status to become a member of the DUP. McCoubrey remains a prominent community activist in the Shankill, working to secure increased funding for the Shankill district, which was named in 2008 as Northern Ireland's most deprived area.

In December 2008, McCoubrey was nominated by Bob Stoker for the post of High Sheriff of Belfast and was sworn into office on 21 January 2009. Subsequently he successfully defended his council seat in the 2011 local elections. He retained his seat for the DUP in 2014 and was also the party's unsuccessful candidate for West Belfast in the 2015 general election and the 2016 Assembly election (also in Belfast West), where he came within 90 votes of winning the first seat for a Unionist party in 13 years.

In 2020, McCoubrey was appointed Lord Mayor of Belfast replacing Sinn Fein's Daniel Baker. Due to the 2020 coronavirus pandemic the traditional handover was replaced with a smaller meeting in front of 18 of the 60 Belfast councillors inside the chamber at City Hall. 

McCoubrey is a member of the board of directors of the Shankill Mirror, a newspaper aimed at the loyalist communities of the Greater Shankill and North Belfast.

References

1967 births
Living people
High Sheriffs of Belfast
Independent politicians in Northern Ireland
Members of Belfast City Council
Ulster Democratic Party politicians
Democratic Unionist Party councillors